The following lists classify music and songs by theme

Songs about a topic

 List of songs about abortion
 List of songs about animal rights
 List of anti-war songs
 List of songs about bicycles
 List of car crash songs
 List of songs about child abuse
 List of songs about the Cold War
 List of songs about nuclear war and weapons
 List of songs about school
 List of songs about the September 11 attacks
 List of songs about the Vietnam War

Songs about people

 List of songs about Adolf Hitler
 Songs that mention Donald Trump
 List of songs about or referencing Elvis Presley
 List of songs about or referencing Syd Barrett
 List of songs about or referencing serial killers

Songs about countries or regions

 List of songs about Clare
 List of songs about Mexico
 List of songs about Ohio
 List of songs about Oklahoma
 List of songs about Pakistan
 List of songs about Puerto Rico
 List of songs about Wicklow

Songs about a city

 List of songs about cities
 List of songs about Ahmedabad
 List of songs about Alabama
 List of songs about Amsterdam
 List of songs about Atlanta
 List of songs about Bangalore
 List of songs about Bareilly
 List of songs about Berlin
 List of songs about Birmingham
 List of songs about Birmingham, Alabama
 List of songs about Boston
 List of songs about Chennai
 List of songs about Chicago
 List of songs about Copenhagen
 List of songs about Cork
 List of songs about Delhi
 List of songs about Detroit
 List of songs about Dhaka
 List of songs about Dubai
 List of songs about Dublin
 List of songs about Oslo
 List of songs about Hamburg
 List of songs about Houston
 List of songs about Jerusalem
 List of songs about Kolkata
 List of songs about Liverpool
 List of songs about London
 List of songs about Los Angeles
 List of songs about Louth
 List of songs about Lucknow
 List of songs about Madras
 List of songs about Manchester
 List of songs about Manila
 List of songs about Melbourne
 List of songs about Miami
 List of songs about Moscow
 List of songs about Mumbai
 List of songs about Nashville, Tennessee
 List of songs about New Orleans
 List of songs about New York City
 List of songs about Paris
 List of songs about Portland, Oregon
 List of songs about Rio de Janeiro
 List of songs about Seattle
 List of songs about Stockholm
 List of songs about Sydney
 List of songs about Tipperary
 List of songs about Tokyo
 List of songs about Toronto
 List of songs about Vancouver

See also
 Lists of music inspired by literature

References